The Texas Tech University College of Arts & Sciences was founded in 1925 as one of Texas Tech University's four original colleges. With 16 departments, the college offers a wide variety of courses and programs in the humanities, social and behavioral sciences, mathematics and natural sciences. Students can choose from 41 bachelor's degree programs, 34 master's degrees and 14 doctoral programs. With over 10,000 students (8,500 undergraduate and 1,200 graduate) enrolled, the College of Arts & Sciences is the largest college on the Texas Tech University campus.

Academic departments 

 Biological Sciences
 Chemistry and Biochemistry
 Classical and Modern Languages and Literatures
 Economics
 English
 Environmental Toxicology
 General Studies Program
 Geosciences
 Kinesiology, and Sport Management
 History
 Mathematics and Statistics
 Philosophy
 Physics
 Political Science
 Psychology
 Sociology, Anthropology, and Social Work

Research centers 

Center for Chemical Biology
Center for Environmental Radiation Studies
Center for Geospatial Technology
The Center for the Integration of STEM Education & Research (CISER)
Center for Public Service
Climate Science Center
College of Arts & Sciences Microscopy
Institute for Forensic Science
Institute for Peace and Conflict
Institute for Studies in Pragmaticism
The Institute of Environmental & Human Health
Medieval & Renaissance Studies Center
Texas Tech Population Center

Notable people

Alumni

Faculty

Gallery

References

External links
 

Educational institutions established in 1925
Schools of social work in the United States
Arts and Sciences
1925 establishments in Texas
Liberal arts colleges at universities in the United States